Warheads (formerly Mega Warheads ) is a brand of sour or tart candy manufactured by Impact Confections, located in Janesville, Wisconsin. They are marketed as an 'extreme' candy with an intense sour flavor. They have proven to be very popular, especially with young children; in 1999, Warheads were referred to as a "$40 million brand" (USD).

The candy was invented in Taiwan in 1975 and was first imported to the United States in 1993 by The Foreign Candy Company of Hull, Iowa. Impact Confections acquired the brand in 2004. They are currently manufactured and distributed in the United States by Impact Confections and in Australia by Universal Candy.

In culture

The name "Warheads" comes from the notion that the sour taste of the candies is akin to a real warhead going off in one's mouth, and the brand's mascot, Wally Warhead, is depicted as a boy with puckered lips and a small mushroom cloud emanating from the top of his head. Their 'extreme' sour flavor can produce visibly strong reactions from people experiencing them for the first time. Citric acid is responsible for the candy's sour taste, which is prolonged by malic acid coated in hydrogenated palm oil.

A driving force behind the candy's early popularity were informal competitions among School-children to determine who could withstand eating the largest number of Warheads at once.

Warheads Extreme Hard Candy has become a popular candy for challenges and contests. Some people see how many candies they can eat at once, while others try to keep the candy in their mouth for as long as possible.

Chemistry

Warheads Extreme Sour Hard Candy derive their strong sour flavor primarily from malic acid, which is applied as a coating to the outside of the small, hard candies. The intense sour flavor fades after about 5 to 10 seconds, leaving a fairly mild candy that contains the much less sour and more flavorful ascorbic and citric acids.

The pH levels of some Warheads products are lower when compared to other sour candies. Warheads Sour Spray was shown to have a pH level of 1.6 (similar to some rust removers).
Candies with high acidity (low pH) can accelerate the erosion of tooth enamel.

Warheads packaging includes this warning: "Eating multiple pieces within a short time period may cause a temporary irritation to sensitive tongues and mouths".

Varieties and flavors 

Warheads Extreme Sour Hard Candies are available in five flavors: blue raspberry, lemon, green apple, black cherry, and watermelon. Five additional hard candy flavors are sold in the "Smashups Extreme Sour" assortment: cherry-lime, orange-pineapple, mango-melon, lemon-berry, and strawberry-grape.

In addition to the Warheads Extreme Sour Hard Candy, the Warheads brand encompasses several other types of candy including gummy, licorice, and liquid formats (among others) which range in their sour intensity: Warheads Extreme Sour Hard Candy Minis (previously known as "Juniors"), Warheads Super Sour Spray, Warheads Sour Jelly Beans, Warheads Super Sour Double Drops, Warheads Sour Cubes, Warheads Lil' Worms, Warheads Ooze Chewz, Warheads Sour Booms, and Warheads Sour Twists. In the early 90s, "hot" versions of the hard candy were also available, but proved to be less popular. In early 2017, Warheads introduced the sub brand "Hotheads" which featured a line of spicy gummy worms (Extreme Heat Worms) and filled licorice bites (Scorching Heat Twists) that were discontinued a few years later.  The Warheads brand also distributed a fizzy version of their signature Warheads for a time.

References

External links 
 

Brand name confectionery
Products introduced in 1975
Products introduced in 1993
Candy
Taiwanese inventions
1993 establishments in the United States
1975 establishments in Taiwan